Dematagoda Grama Niladhari Division is a Grama Niladhari Division of the Thimbirigasyaya Divisional Secretariat of Colombo District of Western Province, Sri Lanka.

Dematagoda and Veluwana College are located within, nearby or associated with Dematagoda.

Dematagoda is a surrounded by the Maligawatta East, Grandpass South, Gajabapura, Meethotamulla, Orugodawatta and Wanathamulla Grama Niladhari Divisions.

Demographics

Ethnicity 

The Dematagoda Grama Niladhari Division has a Sri Lankan Tamil plurality (34.3%), a significant Sinhalese population (30.8%) and a significant Moor population (30.1%). In comparison, the Thimbirigasyaya Divisional Secretariat (which contains the Dematagoda Grama Niladhari Division) has a Sinhalese majority (52.8%), a significant Sri Lankan Tamil population (28.0%) and a significant Moor population (15.1%)

Religion 

The Dematagoda Grama Niladhari Division has a Muslim plurality (37.4%), a significant Buddhist population (29.1%) and a significant Hindu population (22.4%). In comparison, the Thimbirigasyaya Divisional Secretariat (which contains the Dematagoda Grama Niladhari Division) has a Buddhist plurality (47.9%), a significant Hindu population (22.5%) and a significant Muslim population (17.4%)

Gallery

References 

Grama Niladhari Divisions of Thimbirigasyaya Divisional Secretariat